The Hungarian Wirehaired Vizsla is the English name of the Drótszőrű Magyar Vizsla, a dog breed originating in Hungary, with the name translating directly as Hungarian wirehaired pointer. The English plural is vizslas or sometimes vizslak, based on the Hungarian plural vizslák ). 

The Hungarian Wirehaired Vizsla (HWV) is a versatile hunting dog that was traditionally and currently used to hunt, point, and retrieve, referring to the dog's natural ability in tracking, pointing, and retrieving game. The breed also has a level personality making them suited for families. The Wirehaired Vizsla is a versatile, natural hunter endowed with an excellent nose and an above average trainability. Although they are lively, gentle mannered, demonstrably affectionate and sensitive, they are also fearless and possessed of a well-developed protective instinct. The breed has a firmness on point, is an excellent retriever, and has the determination to remain on the scent even when swimming. The overall appearance embodies the qualities of a multi-purpose pointing dog, endurance, working ability and an easily satisfied nature. This is a dog of power and drive in the field, yet is a tractable and affectionate companion in the home. The Hungarian Wirehaired Vizsla is a rare dog breed in Hungary with an estimated 30 litters (approximately 140-150 dogs) being registered annually (as reported in 2009).

Description

Appearance

The Wirehaired Vizsla is a wire-coated hunting dog, with a distinguished appearance and bearing. They have a lean build and are very robust. The coat is an attractive russet to golden sand in color. Where permitted, the tail may be docked to three-fourths of its original length.

Color and coat
The outline of the body is not to be hidden by the longer coat. The coat should never be long, soft, silky, shaggy, crinkle, wooly, thin, lacking undercoat or lacking brushes on the legs.

Size
 Males
 Height: .
 Weight: 
 Females
 Height: 
 Weight: 

Overall symmetry and balance are more important than mere measurable size.

Temperament
Like the shorthaired Vizsla, the Wirehaired Vizsla is gentle-mannered, loyal, caring, and highly affectionate. Notably, this breed is much calmer than the Vizsla or German Wirehaired Pointer that were used to create it. 
The Wirehaired Vizsla quickly forms close bonds with owners, including children. They are quiet dogs, only barking if necessary or if they are provoked.

They are natural hunters with an excellent ability to take training. Not only are they great pointers, but they are excellent retrievers as well. They will retrieve on land and in the water, making the most of their natural instincts. However, they must be trained gently and without harsh commands or strong physical correction, as they have sensitive temperaments and can be easily damaged if trained too harshly (Gottlieb, 1992). Vizslas are excellent swimmers and often swim in pools if one is available. Like all gun dogs, Vizslas require a good deal of exercise to remain healthy and happy. Thirty minutes to an hour of exercise daily in a large off-leash area is optimal (Coffman 1992).

The Wirehaired Vizsla thrives on attention, exercise, and interaction. It is highly intelligent, and enjoys being challenged and stimulated, both mentally and physically. Vizslas that do not get enough attention and exercise can easily become destructive or hyperactive. Under-stimulated Vizslas may also become depressed or engage in obsessive-compulsive behaviours such as persistent licking (Coffman 1992). Vizslas are very gentle dogs that are great around children. The Vizsla wants to be close to its owner as much of the time as possible. Many Vizslas will sleep in bed with their owners if allowed, burrowing under the covers.

History

The Hungarian Wirehaired Vizsla is a completely separate breed from the more commonly known shorthaired Vizsla. The Wirehaired Vizsla was developed in the 1930s, initially by Vasas Jozsef, owner of the Csabai vizsla kennel along with Gresznarik Laszlo, who owned the de Selle German Wirehaired Pointer kennel. Their aim was to produce a dog that combined the color of the Vizsla with a heavier coat, and a more substantial frame, better suited for working in cold weather and retrieving from icy water.

Two Vizsla bitches (Zsuzsi and Csibi), both of whom combined excellent pedigrees with good working ability, were selected to breed with a totally liver colored German Wirehaired Pointer sire (Astor von Potat). Zsuzsi's sire was known to have offspring with longer coats. The best of Zsuzsi's and Csibi's offspring were selected and bred together and Dia de Selle, the first WHV to be exhibited, was born. She had the same body as the shorthaired vizsla, but her head was the shape of the German Wirehaired Pointer. While her coat was not rough and thick enough, she was the promising beginning of the creation of the new breed.

After Jozef and Laszlo, Koloman Slimák worked on creating a Wirehaired Vizsla in Slovakia. It is suggested that he added infusion of Irish Setter and Pointer in addition to German Wirehaired Pointer into his own line of smooth-haired Vizslas. Other anecdotal evidence suggests that Pudelpointer, Bloodhound and Irish Setter blood were added during the period of the Second World War when many other Hungarian kennels became involved in the development of the breed. It has also previously, but incorrectly been suggested that the breed was created by backbreeding of smooth Vizsla's most heavily coated offspring (Gottlieb, idem).

In 2009, there were approximately 400-450 Wirehaired Vizslas in the US and between 2,500 and 3,000 worldwide.

Official recognition
The HWV was recognized in Europe by the Fédération Cynologique Internationale (FCI) under the Hungarian standard in 1963 as the Drötzörü Magyar Vizsla. Introduced to North America in the 1970s, the breed was first recognized by the Canadian Kennel Club in 1977 and North American Versatile Hunting Dog Association in 1986. The breed was recognized by the United Kennel Club in 2006. It was recognized by the Australian National Kennel Council in 2007.

The breed was admitted into AKC's Foundation Stock Service Program in 2008. Effective January 1, 2009, the Wirehaired Vizsla became eligible to compete in AKC Companion and Performance events. The Wirehaired Vizsla was permitted to show in conformation in the AKC Miscellaneous Class starting January 1, 2011. They joined the Sporting Group and became a fully recognized breed on July 2, 2014.

The breed is also recognized in North America by the American Rare Breed Association and the Field Dog Stud Book registries.

Common illnesses
Although the HWV is not generally considered as a sickly dog, breeding from a small number of dogs has led to heritable illnesses in some offspring, including:
 dysphagia-megaesophagus (difficulty swallowing, drooling and muscle wasting)
 hip dysplasia
 hypothyroidism
 sebaceous adenitis
 digestive problems (including intolerance to certain foods or food allergies)
 eye conditions such as:
 ectropion (the upper or lower eyelid curls outward which gives the look of "droopy eyes")
 entropion (the upper or lower eyelid, but in most cases the lower lid, curls inward towards the eye, therefore irritating the cornea)
 idiopathic epilepsy is becoming more common in this breed (Gottlieb 2002)

Responsible breeders do not select dogs for breeding if they have such inherent problems.

See also
 Hungarian dog breeds
 Dogs portal
 List of dog breeds
 Vizsla, a breed that contributed to the original development of the Wirehaired Vizsla

References

External links

 Wirehaired Vizsla Club of America, (US National/Parent Breed Club est. 2003)
 Overview of the Hungarian Wire-Haired Vizsla (by Complete Dogs Guide)
 Hungarian Wirehaired Vizsla Association (UK)

FCI breeds
Dog breeds originating in Hungary
Gundogs
Pointers
Rare dog breeds

de:Vizsla
nl:Vizsla
sk:Maďarský stavač